XAND or variant, may refer to:

 X And - X Andromedae, the variable star
 χ And - Chi Andromedae, the G8III star
 an alternative name for XNOR, a logic gate

See also
 And X (Andromeda X), galaxy
 10 And (10 Andromedae), star